Tripatanci is a village in the municipality of Probištip, North Macedonia. It used to be part of the former municipality of Zletovo.

Demographics
According to the 2002 census, the village had a total of 126 inhabitants. Ethnic groups in the village include:

Macedonians 125
Serbs 1

References

Villages in Probištip Municipality